"Laura" is a song by English recording artist Bat for Lashes for her third studio album The Haunted Man (2012). It was written by Natasha Khan and British songwriter Justin Parker. It received positive reactions from fans when Khan played it at a string of European festival dates. The song received its radio debut on 22 July 2012 on Zane Lowe's BBC Radio 1 show as "Hottest Record in the World" and was made available as an instant download to people who pre-ordered the album on iTunes.

Track listing

Chart performance

Release history

References

2012 singles
Bat for Lashes songs
Pop ballads
Songs written by Justin Parker
Songs written by Bat for Lashes
2012 songs
Parlophone singles